James A. Quayle (1890 – 1936) was an English footballer. He played at left-back.

He started his career as an amateur, with spells at local sides Old Charlton and Woolwich Polytechnic. He joined Woolwich Arsenal in 1907 but left after one season without playing a first-team game. He moved to Northfleet and served there for two seasons before turning professional and rejoining Woolwich Arsenal in October 1910. He made just one appearance for the club, as a deputy for Joe Shaw against The Wednesday on 12 November 1910. In the match, he was badly injured and had to be carried off; unable to play again his football career ended. Quayle joined the Shanghai Municipal Police in 1912, rising through the ranks and becoming a Superintendent in 1930. He died in Detroit while on leave in 1936.

References

1890 births
1936 deaths
English footballers
Woolwich Polytechnic F.C. players
Arsenal F.C. players
Northfleet United F.C. players
English Football League players
Association football defenders